The 2010 MLS Cup Playoffs was the postseason tournament subsequent to Major League Soccer's 2010 season.

The playoffs began on October 30, with the Los Angeles Galaxy defeating the Seattle Sounders FC in the quarterfinal-round. Three weeks later, the Colorado Rapids defeated FC Dallas 2-1 in the Cup final at BMO Field in Toronto, Ontario. It was Colorado's first title and second MLS Cup final appearance, and it was FC Dallas's first appearance in an MLS Cup final.

Of the eight MLS clubs to earn qualification into the tournament, only four of them qualified the season before; Columbus Crew, Los Angeles Galaxy, Seattle Sounders FC, and the defending-champions, Real Salt Lake. The San Jose Earthquakes were making their first playoff appearance since 2005, Dallas' since 2007. It was Colorado's and New York Red Bulls's first time since 2008.

Format 

At the 2010 season's end, the top two teams of each conference advanced to the playoffs; in addition the clubs with the next four highest point totals, regardless of conference, were also added to the playoffs for a total of eight clubs. In the first round of the knockout tournament, aggregate (total) goals over two matches would determine the winners; the Conference Championships was one match each, with the winner of each conference advancing to MLS Cup. In all rounds, the tie-breaking method would be two 15-minute periods of extra time, followed by penalty kicks if necessary. The away goals rule was not used.

Standings

Conference standings

Overall standings

Bracket

Conference Semifinals 

San Jose Earthquakes advance 3–2 on aggregate

Colorado Rapids advance 5–4 on penalties

FC Dallas advance 3–2 on aggregate

Los Angeles Galaxy advance 3–1 on aggregate

Conference Finals

MLS Cup 2010

External links 
 MLS Cup Playoffs at MLSsoccer.com

References 

2010